Mohammad Dehghan (born 23 July 1988) is an Iranian professional futsal coach and former player. He is currently goalkeeping coach of Ana Sanat in the Iranian Futsal Super League.

Honours

Club 
 Iranian Futsal Super League
 Runners-up (2): 2008–09 (Eram Kish) - 2012–13 (Saba)
 Iranian Futsal Hazfi Cup
 Champion (1): 2013–14 (Mahan Tandis)
 Iran Futsal's 1st Division
 Runners-up (1): 2016–17 (Ana Sanat)

References 

1988 births
Living people
People from Qom
Iranian men's futsal players
Futsal goalkeepers
Almas Shahr Qom FSC players
Shahid Mansouri FSC players
Ana Sanat FC players
Iranian futsal coaches